Henry Bertie (4 May 1675 – 18 December 1735) was an English politician and Lords Proprietor of Carolina who sat on the House of Commons from 1705 to 1727.

Biography
Bertie was the third son of James Bertie, 1st Earl of Abingdon and his wife Eleanora Lee, the daughter and heiress of Sir Henry Lee, 3rd Baronet, of Quarrendon, Buckinghamshire.

Bertie was one of the Lords Proprietors of Carolina, heir of the proprietorship granted to Sir William Berkeley. At the 1705 general election, he was returned unopposed as Member of Parliament for Beaumaris, a pocket borough in Wales. He won a contest at Beamaris in the 1708 general election and was returned unopposed in 1710, 1713 and 1715. He won another contest in 1722 but was defeated at the 1727 general election by Watkin Williams-Wynn.

Bertie died at Boulogne on 18 December 1735.

Family
Bertie first married Arabella Susanna Hamilton, daughter of Hugh Hamilton, 1st Viscount of Glenawly, on 17 July 1708, but she died on 10 December 1708. He later married his half-first cousin Mary Bertie, daughter of Peregrine Bertie of Waldershare and granddaughter of Montagu Bertie, 2nd Earl of Lindsey. By her he had one daughter, Susanna Bertie, who married her cousin Charles Bertie, rector of St. Mary le Strand, son of Charles Bertie.

References

Further reading

1675 births
1735 deaths
People from Buckinghamshire
Younger sons of earls
English MPs 1705–1707
British MPs 1707–1708
British MPs 1708–1710
British MPs 1710–1713
British MPs 1713–1715
British MPs 1715–1722
British MPs 1722–1727
Henry
Lords Proprietors of Carolina
Bertie County, North Carolina
Members of the Parliament of England for Beaumaris
Members of the Parliament of Great Britain for Beaumaris